Saalih Ghana Muhammad (born August 25, 1995) is an American former soccer player who played as a defensive midfielder.

Career
After time in the academy teams of Dinamo Zagreb and Portland Timbers, Muhammad returned to Croatia and spent time with the first-teams of HAŠK and Croatia Đakovo, appearing in cup competitions for both. Muhammad came back to the United States again when he signed for North American Soccer League side San Francisco Deltas on February 15, 2017. However, he missed the entirety of the 2017 season after tearing his Achilles tendon in March. On March 15, 2018, Muhammad signed for United Soccer League club Penn FC. On February 21, 2019, Muhammad joined USL side New Mexico United.

On November 24, 2020, Muhammad joined Oakland Roots ahead of their inaugural season in then USL Championship in 2021.

Personal life
Born in the United States, Muhammad is of Ghanaian descent.

Muhammad began operating Oko Agriculture after retiring from football. Oko is an urban farm project operated in conjunction with the non-profit Rio Grande Community Farm.

Career statistics

References

External links

1995 births
Living people
American expatriate soccer players
American soccer players
American sportspeople of Ghanaian descent
Association football midfielders
Expatriate footballers in Croatia
HAŠK players
New Mexico United players
North American Soccer League players
Penn FC players
San Francisco Deltas players
Soccer players from California
Sportspeople from Richmond, California
USL Championship players
American expatriate sportspeople in Croatia
Oakland Roots SC players